was a member of the House of Councillors, the upper house of the Japanese parliament. He was also a member of the Japanese parliament and a member of the Liberal Democratic Party. A native of Tokyo and graduate of the University of Tokyo and Keio University, he was elected to the House of Councillors for the first time in 1998.

He died on January 17, 2017, at the age of 82.

References

External links 
 Official website in Japanese.

1935 births
2017 deaths
Members of the House of Councillors (Japan)
University of Tokyo alumni
Keio University alumni
Liberal Democratic Party (Japan) politicians